On July 17, 2022, a mass shooting occurred at the Greenwood Park Mall in Greenwood, Indiana, United States. The shooting occurred at 5:56 p.m. EDT (UTC−04:00) and lasted less than one minute. Three people were killed and two others were injured in the shooting before the perpetrator, 20-year-old Jonathan Sapirman, was fatally shot by 22-year-old Elisjsha Dicken, a legally armed civilian bystander.

Shooting 
Around 4:55 p.m. on July 17, 2022, the perpetrator of the attack, Jonathan Sapirman, a local citizen from Greenwood, walked a mile from his apartment to the mall, carrying a SIG Sauer M400 semi-automatic rifle, a Smith & Wesson M&P15 AR-15 style semi-automatic rifle, a Glock 33 pistol, and over 100 rounds of ammunition. He went into a restroom near the mall's food court, and did not come out until an hour and two minutes later, at which point he started shooting.

At 5:56:48 p.m. on July 17, 2022, the perpetrator began firing into the food court area of the mall. He first shot and killed Indianapolis native Victor Gomez, who was standing near the restroom entrance. He then turned and fired at a nearby table, fatally shooting Pedro and Rosa Pineda, a married couple from Indianapolis. Sapirman then continued to fire at mall patrons, injuring a 22-year-old woman and a 12-year-old girl.

Fifteen seconds after the shooting began, Elisjsha Dicken, a legally-armed 22-year-old man from Seymour, engaged the shooter in a gunfight. Dicken, a civilian bystander, was shopping with his girlfriend when the perpetrator opened fire. From a distance of forty yards, Dicken fired ten rounds from a Glock handgun, hitting the shooter eight times. The shooter fired once, and attempted to retreat into the restroom, but instead fell to the ground and died soon afterwards.

Afterwards, Dicken approached security guards at the mall, informed them that he had neutralized the shooter, and waited for police to arrive.

Investigation 
A bomb squad was also sent to the mall to investigate a suspicious backpack in one of the bathrooms near a Dick's Sporting Goods store. The backpack was later deemed not to be a threat.

The Indianapolis Metropolitan Police Department stated there was no ongoing threat during a 7:45 p.m. EDT news conference on the day of the shooting. Multiple agencies such as the FBI, ATF, Department of Homeland Security, and the Johnson County Sheriff's Department are assisting in the investigation. However, the motive for the attack is still unclear.

Greenwood's Police Chief James Ison reported that the ammunition Sapirman purchased came from a Range USA store outside Interstate 65 between the borders of Greenwood and Indianapolis which Sapirman had frequented since 2020. Family members also told Greenwood Police that Sapirman frequented a local gun range at the Range USA store and began purchasing guns from various other stores across Greenwood, Southport, and Indianapolis.

CNN said that "few other details have emerged about Dicken", and that Dicken had refused to comment on events, in order to "respect the ongoing criminal investigation by the Greenwood Police Department and take time to honor the three innocent lives lost".

Aftermath 
Police and EMS crews arrived at the mall shortly after the shooting and secured the building. The wounded victims were sent to nearby hospitals to be treated for their injuries.

The Greenwood Park Mall reopened on July 19, 2022, at 11 a.m, a little under two days after the shooting.

Perpetrator 
Jonathan Sapirman (born November 30, 2001), the shooter, had no adult criminal history, but had gotten into a fight while attending Greenwood High School in his hometown in Indiana, and was a juvenile runaway. An article on Heavy.com said that Sapirman "was from a troubled family", and his parents divorced in 2017 (with his father moving to Surprise, Arizona, and his mother subsequently losing her job). He lived in a motel until March 2017. Later during the year, Sapirman was placed in a foster family at the Department of Child Services in Indianapolis, but was kicked out after an occurrence of abuse, and a guardianship petition was submitted by his older brother in 2018. He had a job in a warehouse, which he quit in May, lived in an apartment, from which he was facing eviction by July. Prior to the shooting, he burned his laptop in the oven of his apartment, put his cell phone in a toilet at the shopping center, and allegedly made at least one post on 4chan.

According to a press conference about the shooting, the shooter's most used social-media website was Reddit, where across a 5-year period from 2017 to 2022, he made over 700 comments on posts about mass shooters via his 2 Reddit accounts, u/greatergermanicreich and u/grobergermanic; however, none of the comments indicated he was planning on committing a shooting. Most of his posts were discussions or debates about other high-profile mass shootings around America. He acknowledged that he researched mass shooters and serial killers, and he seemingly enjoyed debating with others about the tactics, motives, and details about these incidents. Sapirman was also fascinated with Nazi Germany.

Reactions 
The mayor of Greenwood, Mark W. Myers, commended Elisjsha Dicken for preventing additional tragedy, stating, "On behalf of the city of Greenwood, I am grateful for his quick action and heroism in this situation." Governor Eric Holcomb, former vice president Mike Pence, representative Jim Banks, representative Jackie Walorski, representative Jim Baird, Representative Trey Hollingsworth, Representative Greg Pence, Indiana Attorney General Todd Rokita, and Senator Mike Braun made similar statements.

In addition to the commendations for Dicken, Indiana House and Senate Democrats, Representative Mitch Gore, and Representative André Carson also expressed their sympathies towards the victims and their families, as well as speaking about the issue of gun violence in the United States. Greenwood police chief James Ison said at a news conference that Dicken was a "responsible armed citizen that took action very quickly", and that his actions had been "very proficient". According to investigators, Dicken had "no police training and no military training", and was taught how to shoot by his grandfather.

On July 24, 2022, Sapirman's father and older brother released a statement through an attorney conveying condolences to those affected and that they were "unable to explain [the gunman's] actions", that they were cooperating with law enforcement and that they held "no feelings of hostility toward Mr. Dicken".

See also 
 List of mass shootings in the United States in 2022
 Indianapolis FedEx shooting

References 

2022 active shooter incidents in the United States
2022 in Indiana
2022 mass shootings in the United States
2022 murders in the United States
2020s crimes in Indiana
Attacks on buildings and structures in 2022
Attacks on buildings and structures in the United States
Attacks on shopping malls
Deaths by firearm in Indiana
July 2022 crimes in the United States
Defensive gun use
Mass shootings in Indiana
Mass shootings in the United States